The Icelandic Esperanto Association (Esperantosamband Íslands) is one of the national associations of the Universal Esperanto Association (UEA). It was founded in 1950 and joined the Universal Esperanto Association in 1975. It publishes a magazine called La velo (The Sail). Its president is Hannes Högni Vilhjálmsson (as of November 2014).

The association has twice hosted the World Esperanto Congress: the 62nd in the summer of 1997 and the 98th in Reykjavík from July 20 to July 27, 2013.

The first national Esperanto association in Iceland, Samband íslenzkra esperantista, was founded in 1931.

References

Further reading

External links
 Official website
 Older official website

Esperanto organizations